Lyric Ross (born November 30, 2003) is an American actress. She is known for her role as Deja Pearson in the NBC drama series This Is Us.

Early life and career 
Ross, raised in Homewood, Illinois, is the daughter of Brandi Smith and Stephen Ross and granddaughter of Margaret Smith. She started acting when she was five years old, appearing in commercials and guest-starring in Chicago Fire and Sirens. In 2017, she performed in a recurring role as Deja Pearson on season 2 of This Is Us while in the eighth grade at James Hart School in Homewood, Illinois. On August 27, 2018, NBC announced that Ross had been promoted to a series regular for season 3.

Philanthropy 
Ross serves as a celebrity ambassador for Orphan Myth.

Filmography

Film

Television

Awards and nominations

References

External links 

Living people
American actresses
Actors from Illinois
African-American actresses
2003 births